Battle of Milazzo may refer to the following battles fought near the city of Milazzo in Sicily, southern Italy:

 Battle of Mylae (260 BC)
Battle of Milazzo (880)
Battle of Milazzo (888)
Battle of Milazzo (1718), during the War of the Quadruple Alliance
Battle of Milazzo (1719)
Battle of Milazzo (1860)